The 2015 CBSA World Chinese Eight-ball Championship (also known as the 2015 Chinese Pool World Championship) was a professional pool tournament that took place from 24 January to 2 February 2015. The event was held in the First High School Stadium in Yushan, Jiangxi in China. This tournament was the inaugural CBSA World Chinese Eight-ball Championship event, played under the Chinese eight-ball rules.

Darren Appleton won the event, defeating Mark Selby in the final 21–19. Chinese players Liu Haitao and Chu Bingjie were third and fourth respectively. The women's competition was won by Bai Ge who defeated Zhang Xiaotong 17–13. Yu Han came in third place, with Allison Fisher in fourth place.

Prize fund

Results

Womens

References

External links
 Chinese 8-Ball World Championship 2015 on the World Pool-Billiard Association website

Sport in Jiangxi
Pool competitions